George of Antioch may refer to:
George of Antioch (d. 1151/1152)
George the Confessor, Bishop of Antioch in Pisidia (d. 814)
George I of Antioch, Greek Orthodox Patriarch of Antioch (r. 640-656)
George I of Antioch, Syriac Orthodox Patriarch of Antioch (r. 758-790)
George II of Antioch, Greek Orthodox Patriarch of Antioch (r. 690–695)
George III of Antioch, Greek Orthodox Patriarch of Antioch (r. 902–917)
Ignatius George II, Syriac Orthodox Patriarch of Antioch (r. 1687–1708)
Ignatius George III, Syriac Orthodox Patriarch of Antioch (r. 1745–1768)
Ignatius George IV, Syriac Orthodox Patriarch of Antioch (r. 1768–1781)
Ignatius George V, Syriac Orthodox Patriarch of Antioch (r. 1819–1837)
Ignatius George V Shelhot, Syriac Catholic Patriarch of Antioch (r. 1874–1891)